Yannis Yssaad (born 25 June 1993) is a French former professional cyclist.

Major results

2014
 6th Grand Prix de Denain
2015
 1st Stage 6 Tour de Bretagne
2016
 1st Stage 4 Rhône-Alpes Isère Tour
 3rd Cholet-Pays de Loire
 3rd Grand Prix de la Somme
 4th Route Adélie
2017
 1st Paris–Troyes
 1st Stage 6 Rás Tailteann
 1st Stage 2 Ronde de l'Oise
 Troféu Joaquim Agostinho
1st Stages 1 & 3a
 2nd Grand Prix de la Ville de Lillers
 7th Route Adélie
2018
 1st Stage 4 Rhône-Alpes Isère Tour

References

External links

1993 births
Living people
French male cyclists